Omladinsko sportsko društvo Beograd, commonly abbreviated as OSD Beograd, is a multi-sports club from Belgrade, Serbia. Founded in 1945, it's an umbrella organization featuring teams in several sports.

Active teams
OFK Beograd - Omladinski fudbalski klub 
OKK Beograd - Omladinski košarkaški klub 
ORK Beograd - Omladinski rukometni klub 
OAK Beograd - Omladinski atletski klub 
OBK Beograd - Omladinski biciklistički klub
OŠK Beograd - Omladinski šahovski klub 
OJK Beograd - Omladinski džudo klub 
OTK Beograd - Omladinski teniski klub

Defunct clubs
OHK Beograd - Omladinski hokejaški klub

History
It was founded on March 25, 1945 as Sportski Klub Metalac, in the summer of 1950 the name changed to Beogradsko sportsko društvo. In the winter of 1957 it changed to Omladinsko sportsko društvo Beograd.

External links
 Official website

 
Multi-sport clubs in Serbia
Sport in Belgrade